Aragues or Aragüés may refer to
Aragüés del Puerto, a municipality in Huesca, Aragon, Spain
Aragüés Aragonese, the Aragonese variety spoken in Aragüés and Jasa 
Juan de Aragüés (c.1710–1793), Spanish composer